Aliakmonas is a Greek village located in the municipality of Voio (until 1997 was Community), in the regional unit of Kozani. It is located on the left bank of its namesake, the River Aliakmon. 

At an altitude of 550 meters, Aliakmonas is the lowest village in Voio. Views include the Tymfi mountains, Smolikas, Voio, and Grammos. To the northeast, it provides views of the Askio mountain range. There are fertile plains in the valley of Aliakmonas River. The area produces tobacco and wheat.

A folklore museum, housed in the old village school, was founded in 2009.

History
Archaeological digs near Aliakmonas have uncovered a few notable specimens. A statue of Aphrodite by the Greek sculptor Scopa (4th Century BC), for example, was discovered in a nearby settlement, where an early Christian mosaic floor was also uncovered. Coins, ceramics, statues, mosaics, floors were found near there.

The village (under the name Vrantini) was mentioned in writing as early as 1534 AD, in the code of Zavorda. The name was changed in the 1960s to Paliourion, and subsequently to Aliakmonas. Statistical reporting in the early 20th century referred to the settlement as a Greek village in the sanjak Servia with a population of 400; if immediately surrounding settlements are included, the total population may have amounted to 750.

References

External links
https://web.archive.org/web/20171222162630/http://www.kozaniguide.com/

Populated places in Kozani (regional unit)
Villages in Greece